The SZD-18 Czajka (Szybowcowy Zakład Doświadczalny - Glider Experimental Works) (Czajka in ) was a single-seat glider designed and built in Poland in 1956.

Development 
The last attempt by the LPŻ ( Liga Przyjaciół Żołnierza – Soldier's Friends League) paramilitary organization to design a single-seat training glider, after SZD-15 and SZD-16 designs, was the SZD-18 Czajka (lapwing), which appeared in 1956. It had a simple structure, box fuselage, strutted high wing and low performance typical for the primary type of training glider. The  LPŻ held a competition in 1955 for the design of a new primary style single-seat trainer, which was won in March 1955 by the design by Tadeusz Grudzieński, named X-11. The prototype glider was constructed in the SZD in Bielsko by Władysław Okarmus, and designated SZD-18. Flight trials began on 30 November 1956 (pilot Adam Zientek) proving, that the SZD-18 had good handling qualities and performance adequate for its intended role. It was regarded as one of the best gliders in its class and the Polish best training glider. However, the aero clubs, now independent of the LPŻ, rejected the single-seat training concept, moving towards the more conventional two-seat pupil/instructor method, which had been proven to be quicker, more efficient and safer. No production was carried out and the sole prototype (SP-1640) flew as a club glider with the Warsaw aero club until 1966, when it was given to the Polish Aviation Museum in Kraków.

Specifications (SZD-18 Czajka with nacelle)

See also

References

Further reading
  
  Taylor, J. H. (ed) (1989) Jane's Encyclopedia of Aviation. Studio Editions: London. p. 29
  "Modelarz" No 4 / 60 (April 1960).

External links

http://www.dasvirtuelleluftfahrtmuseum.de/htmi/itf/szd18.htm
http://www.abpic.co.uk/search.php?q=PZL-Bielsko%20SZD-18%20Czajka&u=type
http://www.airliners.net/search/photo.search?aircraft_genericsearch=PZL-Bielsko%20SZD-18%20Czajka&distinct_entry=true
http://www.abpic.co.uk/photo/1087370/
http://www.muzeumlotnictwa.pl/zbiory_sz.php?ido=93&w=a

SZD-18
1950s Polish sailplanes
Aircraft first flown in 1956